Eser Kardeşler (born 26 February 1964) is a Turkish football manager and player who played as a goalkeeper. Kardeşler was the main goalkeeper for Bursaspor in the 1980s, and had a long career afterwards in the lower divisions of Turkish football.

Personal life
Kardeşler's son, Erce Kardeşler is also a professional footballer who plays as a goalkeeper. His other son Arda is a professional referee.

References

External links
 
 TFF Manager Profile
 
 Mackolik Manager Profile

1964 births
Living people
Sportspeople from Bursa
Turkish footballers
Turkey youth international footballers
Turkey under-21 international footballers
Turkish football managers
Bursaspor footballers
Aydınspor footballers
Mersin İdman Yurdu footballers
Dardanelspor footballers
Kardemir Karabükspor footballers
Göztepe S.K. footballers
Erzincanspor footballers
Akhisarspor footballers
Süper Lig players
Fethiyespor managers
TFF First League players
TFF Second League players
Association football goalkeepers